Zarqan is a city in Fars Province, Iran.

Zarqan or Zaraqan, also rendered as Zaraghan or Zarghan, may refer to:
 Zarghan, East Azerbaijan
 Zaraqan, Hamadan
 Zarqan, Razavi Khorasan
 Zarqan, South Khorasan
 Zarqan District, in Fars Province
 Zarqan Rural District, in Fars Province